Captain Basil Rawdon Jackson (20 May 1892 – 29 March 1957) was a British businessman. Jackson was the second chairman of the board of British Petroleum, from 1956 to 1957

Jackson was born in St John's, Newfoundland Colony, the son of Sir Henry Moore Jackson, a British colonial governor, and Emily Corbett Shea, daughter of Sir Edward Dalton Shea. He was working in the oil industry and living in New York City during the 1930 and 1940 Censuses. He was deputy chairman of BP, and in 1956 succeeded William Fraser, 1st Baron Strathalmond as chairman. He stepped down due to poor health in January 1957 and died in March the same year.

In 1957, he was succeeded by Neville Gass as chairman of BP.

References

1892 births
1957 deaths
Businesspeople from St. John's, Newfoundland and Labrador
British businesspeople in the oil industry
British chairpersons of corporations
Chairmen of BP
British expatriates in the United States
20th-century British businesspeople
British people in the Colony of Newfoundland